Capilla may refer to:

A medieval Spanish term for a chapel
Capilla, Badajoz, Spain
Capillas, Castile and León, Spain
Capillas District, Peru
La Capilla, Colombia

People
 Doug Capilla (born 1952), American baseball player
 Eneko Capilla (born 1995), Spanish footballer
 Joaquín Capilla (1928–2010), Mexican diver

See also